Biferrocene is the organometallic compound with the formula [(C5H5)Fe(C5H4)]2.  It is the product of the formal dehydrocoupling of ferrocene, analogous the relationship between biphenyl and benzene. It is an orange, air-stable solid that is soluble in nonpolar organic solvents.

Biferrocene can be prepared by the Ullmann coupling of iodoferrocene.  Its one-electron oxidized derivative [(C5H5)Fe(C5H4)]2+ attracted attention as a prototypical mixed-valence compound.

A related compound is biferrocenylene, [Fe(C5H4)2]2 wherein all cyclopentadienyl rings are coupled.  Formally, biferrocene is derived from one fulvalene ligand, and biferrocenylene is derived from two.

Reactions 
Biferrocene can easily be converted into a mixed-valence complex, which is called biferrocenium.  This [Fe(II)-Fe(III)] cation is a class II type (0.707 > α > 0) mixed-valence complex according to the Robin-Day classification.

Derivatives
Aminophosphine ligands with biferroceno substituents have been prepared as catalysts for asymmetric allylic substitution and asymmetric hydrogenation of alkenes.

Related compounds 
 Bis(fulvalene)diiron

References

Ferrocenes
Sandwich compounds
Cyclopentadienyl complexes